Herta Hafner was an Italian luger who competed from the late 1970s to the mid-1980s. A natural track luger, she won the gold medal in the women's singles event at the 1982 FIL World Luge Natural Track Championships in Feld am See, Austria.

Hafner also earned to bronze medals in the women's singles event at the FIL European Luge Natural Track Championships (1979, 1985).

References
Natural track European Championships results 1970-2006.
Natural track World Championships results: 1979-2007

Italian lugers
Italian female lugers
Living people
Year of birth missing (living people)
Sportspeople from Südtirol